Rolf Harris Cartoon Time is a British children's television show presented by  Rolf Harris, and first broadcast on BBC1 between 1979 and 1989.

The show featured animations from various contributors.

References

External links

Rolf Harris

1970s British children's television series
1980s British children's television series
1979 British television series debuts
1987 British television series endings
BBC children's television shows